is a railway station in the city of Higashimatsushima, Miyagi Prefecture, Japan, operated by East Japan Railway Company (JR East).

Lines
Higashi-Yamoto Station is served by the Senseki Line. It is located 41.6 rail kilometers from the terminus of the Senseki Line at Aoba-dōri Station.

Station layout
The station has one side platform serving single bi-directional. The station is unattended.

History
Higashi-Yamoto Station opened on March 31, 1987, the day before the JNR was privatized, becoming JR East.

The station was closed from March 11, 2011 due to damage to the line associated with the 2011 Tōhoku earthquake and tsunami, and services were replaced by provisional bus services.

Surrounding area

See also
 List of railway stations in Japan

References

External links

 

Railway stations in Miyagi Prefecture
Senseki Line
Railway stations in Japan opened in 1987
Higashimatsushima, Miyagi
Stations of East Japan Railway Company